Flaviramulus basaltis is a Gram-negative and motile bacterium from the genus of Flaviramulus.

References

Sphingobacteriia
Bacteria described in 2006